GID (or Gid, gid) may refer to:

Gender-related
 Gender identity disorder
 Gender, Institutions and Development Data Base, OECD gender-related data

People
 Gid (Book of Mormon), Nephite military officer
 Gid Gardner (1859–1914), American baseball player
 Gid Tanner (1885–1960), American musician

Other
 Gid, Arkansas, United States, an unincorporated community 
 Coenurosis, a parasitic tapeworm infection, primarily of sheep
 General Intelligence Directorate (disambiguation)
 Geneva International Discussions, international negotiations about Georgia (the country) 
 Gidar language, spoken in Cameroon and Chad
 Gitega Airport, in Burundi
 Grazing incidence diffraction, use of X-rays etc. to analyse surfaces 
 Great icosidodecahedron, a geometrical figure
 Group identifier, on Unix-like systems

See also
 Gide
 GIDS (disambiguation) 
 GYD (disambiguation)